Soul Electricity! is an album by saxophonist Sonny Stitt recorded in 1968 and released on the Prestige label. The album features Stitt using the varitone, an electronic amplification device which altered the saxophone's sound.

Reception

Allmusic awarded the album 3 stars stating: "The album gets its name because for this session, Stitt plugged his alto and tenor saxophones into a Varitone attachment. What came out, though, was not fusion by any means, but a pretty straight-ahead session that found Sonny his usual competent self. The program is actually on the conservative side, leaning toward standards".

Track listing 
 "All the Things You Are" (Oscar Hammerstein II, Jerome Kern) - 5:58   
 "Lover Man" (Jimmy Davis, Roger "Ram" Ramirez, Jimmy Sherman) - 3:25   
 "P.S. I Love You" (Gordon Jenkins, Johnny Mercer) - 5:35   
 "Stella by Starlight" (Ned Washington, Victor Young) - 5:24   
 "Bye Bye Blackbird" (Mort Dixon, Ray Henderson) - 5:33   
 "Over the Rainbow" (Harold Arlen, Yip Harburg) - 3:57   
 "Candy" (Mack David, Alex Kramer, Joan Whitney) - 5:50   
 "Strike Up the Band" (George Gershwin, Ira Gershwin) - 3:30

Personnel 
Sonny Stitt - alto saxophone, tenor saxophone, varitone
Don Patterson - organ
Billy Butler - guitar 
Billy James - drums

References 

1968 albums
Prestige Records albums
Sonny Stitt albums
Albums recorded at Van Gelder Studio
Albums produced by Don Schlitten